Antonio Minevski is a former Macedonian professional basketball small forward.

References

External links
 

1972 births
Living people
Macedonian men's basketball players
Small forwards
Sportspeople from Skopje